The members of the seventh National Assembly of South Korea were elected on 8 June 1967. The assembly sat from 1 July 1967 until 30 June 1971.

Members

Seoul

Busan

Gyeonggi

Gangwon

North Chungcheong

South Chungcheong

North Jeolla

South Jeolla

North Gyeongsang

South Gyeongsang

Jeju

Proportional representation

Notes

See also 

 1967 South Korean legislative election
 National Assembly (South Korea)#History

References 

007
National Assembly members 007